Carolina Heights Historic District is a national historic district located at Wilmington, New Hanover County, North Carolina. The district encompasses 421 contributing buildings, 1 contributing site, and 1 contributing object in a predominantly residential section of Wilmington.  The district developed as planned suburban areas between about 1908 and 1950 and includes notable examples of Queen Anne, Classical Revival, Colonial Revival, and Bungalow / American Craftsman style architecture.  Notable buildings include the New Hanover High School (1922), the Trinity Methodist Episcopal Church (1921), St. Paul's Episcopal Church (1927/1956-1958), First Church of Christ, Scientist (1928), Sinclair Service Station (c. 1936), and Yopp Funeral Home (1936).

It was listed on the National Register of Historic Places in 1999, with a boundary increase in 1999.

References

Historic districts on the National Register of Historic Places in North Carolina
Queen Anne architecture in North Carolina
Colonial Revival architecture in North Carolina
Neoclassical architecture in North Carolina
Buildings and structures in Wilmington, North Carolina
National Register of Historic Places in New Hanover County, North Carolina